The 2019 Korn Ferry Tour was the 30th season of the top developmental tour for the PGA Tour in men's golf. The season began under the Web.com Tour name but changed in June to the Korn Ferry Tour. The season ran from January 13 to September 2 and consists of 27 official money tournaments, four of them played outside of the United States.

Schedule
The following table lists official events during the 2019 season.

Location of tournaments

Points leaders
For full rankings, see 2019 Korn Ferry Tour Finals graduates.

Regular season points leaders
The regular season points list was based on prize money won during the season, calculated using a points-based system. The top 25 players on the tour earned status to play on the 2019–20 PGA Tour.

Finals points leaders
A further 25 players earned status to play on the 2019–20 PGA Tour, via the Korn Ferry Tour Finals.

Awards

Notes

References

External links
Official schedule

Korn Ferry Tour seasons
Korn Ferry Tour